Miroslava Skleničková (born 11 March 1951, in Karlovy Vary), also known as Miroslava Denková, is a Czech former gymnast who competed for Czechoslovakia in the 1968 Summer Olympics.

References

External links
 
 

1951 births
Living people
Czech female artistic gymnasts
Olympic gymnasts of Czechoslovakia
Gymnasts at the 1968 Summer Olympics
Olympic silver medalists for Czechoslovakia
Olympic medalists in gymnastics
Sportspeople from Karlovy Vary
Medalists at the 1968 Summer Olympics